Munich-Mittersendling station is a Munich S-Bahn railway station in the borough of Mittersendling. It has an access for disabled people.

References

External links

Mittersendling
Mittersendling